The North Carolina General Assembly 2011–2012 was the state legislature that first convened on January 26, 2011 and concluded in December 2012. Members of the North Carolina Senate and the North Carolina House of Representatives were elected on November 2, 2010. This 149th North Carolina General Assembly was the first North Carolina General Assembly with a Republican majority in both chambers since 1870.

Legislation
A complete list of Session laws passed by this legislature is found at 2011 Session laws.  There were 419 laws passed in 2011 and 203 in 2012.   Among the Session laws that passed was 2011-409, "AN ACT TO AMEND THE CONSTITUTION TO PROVIDE THAT MARRIAGE BETWEEN ONE MAN AND ONE WOMAN IS THE ONLY DOMESTIC LEGAL UNION THAT SHALL BE VALID OR RECOGNIZED IN THIS STATE."

State House of Representatives
The North Carolina state House of Representatives, during the 2011–12 session, consisted of 68 Republicans and 52 Democrats. At the beginning of the session, there was one independent member, Rep. Bert Jones, who caucused with the Republicans, but he formally changed his registration to Republican around September 2011.  The members included 35 women, 18 African-Americans, and one Native American out of 120 members.

House Leadership

The following members were the leadership of the House of Representatives:

House Members
The following were the members of the House of Representatives during 20112012:

Senate
The state Senate, during the 2011–12 session, consisted of 31 Republicans and 19 Democrats.  The senate members included six females and six African-Americans, as well as 15 attorneys and three small business owners.

Senate leaders

Senate leadership included the following

Senate Members
The following table lists the Senators, their party, city of residence, and the district and counties they represented:

↑: Member was originally appointed to fill the remainder of an unexpired term.

Notes

References

External links
 of the Legislature

2011
General Assembly
General Assembly
 2011
 2011
2011 U.S. legislative sessions
2012 U.S. legislative sessions